Acrocercops macroplaca is a moth of the family Gracillariidae, known from Meghalaya, India. It was described by Edward Meyrick in 1915.

References

macroplaca
Moths of Asia
Moths described in 1908